In the Blood may refer to:

Books
In the Blood, a 1990 novel by Nancy A. Collins
In the Blood, a 2009 novel by Jack Kerley
 In the Blood (Unger novel), a 2014 novel by Lisa Unger
 In the Blood (Doctor Who), a 2016 novel by Jenny Colgan
In the Blood: A Memoir of My Childhood, a book by Andrew Motion
In the Blood: God, Genes and Destiny, a book by Steve Jones
Punisher: In the Blood, a 2011 comic book by Rick Remender
 In the Blood, a 1992 poetry collection by Carl Phillips

Film, television and theatre
 In the Blood (1923 film), a British silent sports drama film
 In the Blood (1988 film), a Hong Kong action film
 In the Blood (2014 film), a film starring Gina Carano and Cam Gigandet
 In the Blood (2016 film), a Danish film
 In the Blood (Daredevil), a television episode
 In the Blood (The Outer Limits), a television episode
 In the Blood (play), a 1999 play by Suzan-Lori Parks

Music
 In the Blood (album), a 1990 album by Londonbeat
 "In the Blood" (Better Than Ezra song), 1995
 "In the Blood" (John Mayer song), 2017
 "In the Blood", a 1992 single by Rob Crosby